The Ulyanovsk Civil Aviation Institute is a state educational institution of higher professional education in Ulyanovsk, Russia.

The right for educational activity in the School is authorised by license №24Г-0299 issued by the Russian Federation Ministry of general and professional education on 1 April 1999 and certificate №25-0790 of state approval granted by the Russian Federation Ministry of Education on 7 December 1999. The School owns Certificate 005 of Federal Aviation Authority of Russia dated by 20 February 2002.

History 
The Ulyanovsk Civil Aviation Institute is the oldest flight school for civil pilots training in Russia.

The flight school started its activities in 1935 in Bataysk.

In 1939 due to the unsafe international situation, the school moved to Mineralnye Vody, meanwhile Bataysk United school was given to RKKA.

In October 1941 due to World War II, the school was relocated to Tashkent, and its main task became to provide the Red Army with Il-2 pilots. In May 1944 the school came back to Mineralnye Vody, where they continued to train specialists on Il-2 aircraft, and in 1947 they started to train civilian pilots on a new aeroplane, the Il-12.

Also in 1947 the school was renamed from "Higher flight courses"(КВЛП/KVLP) to "Higher flight school"(ШВЛП/ShVLP), which was relocated to Buguruslan in Orenburg Oblast, and later to Ulyanovsk in 1950. In 1955 Il-14 pilot training started, and in 1958 pilot training on An-10 and Il-18, aeroplanes with turboshaft engines began.
In the beginning of the 60s, the school started to train Tu-104 pilots.

In November 1955 the training of foreign pilots started, when specialists from East Germany arrived. But a really mass training of air crew started in 1957. Pilots, flight-engineers, flight-radio operators from GDR, Bulgaria, Romania and Hungary were trained on the Il-14. When aeroplanes with turboprop engines Il-18 and An-10 arrived, training of pilots from Guinea, Mali and Ghana started as well. From 1962 to 1972 in Ulyanovsk Higher Flight School were mastered a lot of aeroplanes such as the Tu-124, Tu-134, Tu-154 and An-24.
In December 1974 it was decided to create "Comecon Civil Aviation Centre"(Центр ГА СЭВ). Firstly it was decided to build Training Laboratories, an Aviation Training Centre and a Hotel. On the next turn it was planned to build a Medical Centre, Gym, Swimming Pool, etc. In the beginning of 1983 the building of the Centre's main objectives was completed. In this period Il-62, Il-76, Il-86 and Yak-42 pilot training started. From 1980 to 1985 more than 15 thousand aviation specialists from 40 countries were trained. In 1985 when the Civil Aviation Centre of Comecon was celebrating its 50th Anniversary, it was awarded with the Order of Friendship of Peoples.

In 1983 The Museum of Civil Aviation of the USSR was organised in Comecon Civil Aviation Centre. Besides 4 galleries with approximately 7000 exhibits and documents, 28 aeroplanes and helicopters are standing in the open air, including the first passenger aircraft Tu-104 and the first supersonic passenger aircraft Tu-144.

Due to the USSR's demise, Higher Civil Aviation schools based in Aktobe and Kirovograd were left outside Russia. As the result there was a problem of air crew training with higher professional education for the airlines of Russia. To solve that problem, in October 1992 it was decided to reform "Comecon Civil Aviation Centre" into the "Ulyanovsk Higher Civil Aviation School".

In 1994 an ATC training started.

In 1995 an extramural studying form started.

In 1998 the first "pilots-engineers" and "air traffic controllers-engineers" graduated from UHCAS.

In 2000 a Search-and-Rescue specialists' and managers' training course started.

In February 2013 there were 1030 cadet-pilots studying. 137 pilots graduated in 2013, and in 2014 the figure was 188 pilots.

On 14 January 2016, "Ulyanovsk Higher Civil Aviation School" was renamed the "Ulyanovsk Civil Aviation Institute", named after Air Chief Marshal Boris Pavlovich Bugaev.

Available specialities 
The Institute provides specialist training in accordance with higher professional education curricula based on the requirements of State educational standards of the Russian Federation. The following specialities are available:

 Civil Aviation pilot with qualification 
 Air Traffic controller with qualification “engineer”
 Search-and-Rescue specialist of CA with qualification “engineer-bachelor”
 Flight Safety specialist with qualification "engineer-bachelor"
 Quality control specialist
 Safety of technological processes specialist
 Aircraft fuel and refueling specialist

Simulator Training Centre 

Simulator Training Centre is structural unit of Ulyanovsk Civil Aviation Institute, formed in 2004. Based on Department of Qualification Increasing and Retraining of aviation specialists.

It includes following full flight simulators:
FNPT Boeing-737NG
FFS A320
FNPT SSJ 100
FNPT DA40, DA42
FNPT C-172
KTS Tu-204
KTS Yak-18T 
And others.

Flight practice 

Nowadays Ulyanovsk Civil Aviation Institute uses a DA40 aircraft for primary flight training as a single-engine aeroplane, and a DA42 for secondary flight training as a double-engine aeroplane.

See also 
The official site

References 

Universities in Volga Region
Defunct airlines of Russia
Companies based in Ulyanovsk
Airlines disestablished in 2011
Ulyanovsk
1935 establishments in Russia
Buildings and structures in Ulyanovsk Oblast
Educational institutions established in 1935